Gaby: A True Story is a 1987 biographical drama film directed by Luis Mandoki. An international co-production of the United States and Mexico, it stars Rachel Chagall (who, at the time, was billed under her real name, Rachel Levin), Norma Aleandro, Liv Ullmann, and Robert Loggia. Written by Michael Love and Martín Salinas, the film chronicles the lives of Gabriela Brimmer, a Mexican writer and disability rights activist, and her caretaker, Florencia Sánchez Morales.

Synopsis
The story chronicles the life of Gaby Brimmer, the child of Austrian Jewish refugees living in Mexico, who is born with cerebral palsy. Though most of her body is completely paralyzed, her mind and left foot are unaffected, and she is able to become a college graduate and an acclaimed author.

Cast
Rachel Chagall as Gabriela Brimmer (billed as Rachel Levin)
Norma Aleandro as Florencia Sánchez Morales
Liv Ullmann as Sari Brimmer, Gaby's mother 
Robert Loggia as Michel Brimmer, Gaby's father
Susana Alexander as Dr. Betty Modley, Sari's sister and Gaby's aunt
Lawrence Monoson as Fernando
Robert Beltran as Luis
Beatriz Sheridan as Fernando's mother
Tony Goldwyn as David

Release
The film was released in the United States on October 30, 1987. In the Philippines, the film was released on June 2, 1988.

Critical response
Janet Maslin of The New York Times said the film was blunt and unsentimental, and praised Aleandro very highly.

Accolades

Nominated

Academy Awards
Academy Award for Best Supporting Actress (Aleandro)

Casting Society of America
Best Casting – Motion Picture Drama

Golden Globe Awards
Best Actress – Motion Picture Drama (Chagall)
Best Supporting Actress – Motion Picture (Aleandro)

References

External links

1987 films
1980s English-language films
1980s American films
American biographical drama films
Films about people with cerebral palsy
Films about writers
Films based on biographies
Films directed by Luis Mandoki
Films set in the 20th century
Films set in Mexico
Films shot in Mexico
TriStar Pictures films
Films about disability